Koprivnik (or Nesselthal) is a settlement in the Municipality of Kočevje in southern Slovenia. It was a village settled by Gottschee Germans until 1941. During the Second World War its original population was expelled. The area is part of the traditional region of Lower Carniola and is now part of the Southeast Slovenia Statistical Region.

History
The Koprivnik volunteer fire department became a founding unit of the Kočevje municipal fire department on 28 August 1955.

Church
The local parish church in the village was dedicated to Saint James and was built in 1622 on the location of a 14th-century church. It was set on fire in 1949 and its ruins totally removed in 1955. A 19th-century chapel built outside the village next to the main cemetery was a dedicated to Saint Anne and was burnt to the ground in 1956. A church was built in its place in 1973. The cemetery is one of only ten in the Kočevje region to have (mostly) preserved the gravestones of the Gottschee Germans. Some of the gravestones have been professionally restored.

Notable people
Notable people that were born or lived in Koprivnik include the following:
August Schauer (1872–1941), parish priest at Koprivnik for over 30 years and editor of the Gottscheer Kalender (Gottschee Almanac) from 1925 to 1941

References

External links

Koprivnik on Geopedia
Pre–World War II map of Koprivnik with oeconyms and family names

Populated places in the Municipality of Kočevje